Loye Holmes Miller (18 October 1874 – 6 April 1970), was an American paleontologist and zoologist who served as professor of zoology at the University of California, Los Angeles,  University of California, Berkeley, and University of California, Davis.

Loye Miller was born in Minden, Louisiana, to parents George and Cora Holmes Miller and grew up in Riverside, California. 
 
Miller studied at the University of California, Berkeley, earning a B.A. in chemistry (1898), an M.A. in zoology (1904) and Ph.D. in paleontology (1912). He taught for three years at Oahu College (now called Punahou School) in Honolulu before earning his master's degree.  He was first instructor of biology at Los Angeles State Normal School (which would later become UCLA), teaching from 1904 to 1919. He later became a professor, retiring in 1943.

His research included, among others. fossil birds from Pleistocene caves in California, the La Brea Tar Pits, and the Green River Formation in Oregon. With funding from the University Regents, he and John C. Merriam excavated La Brea from 1905 to 1907 and in 1912–1913. Miller was a fellow of the American Association for the Advancement of Science, American Ornithological Union, and California Academy of Sciences. He served as vice-president of the Society of Vertebrate Paleontology. He was awarded an honorary LL.D. by the University of California in 1951. Known as "Padre" to friends and colleagues, He supervised two Ph.D. students, two master's students, and served on the dissertation committee of paleontologist Hildegarde Howard.

Miller died April 6, 1970, in Davis, California. He was survived by his son Holmes Odell, three grandchildren and seven great grandchildren. His elder son Alden Holmes Miller, who died in 1965, was a professor of zoology at UC Berkeley, and director of the Museum of Vertebrate Zoology.


Books
 (with Ida DeMay)
 (with Robert C. Stebbins)

References

Further reading

External links

Guide to the Loye Holmes Miller papers, 1899-1957 at the Bancroft Library, UC Berkeley

1874 births
1970 deaths
American paleontologists
American ornithologists
University of California, Berkeley alumni
University of California, Berkeley faculty
University of California, Los Angeles faculty
University of California, Davis faculty
People from Minden, Louisiana
Fellows of the American Association for the Advancement of Science
Writers from Louisiana
20th-century American zoologists